Stouffville College (SC) is a for-profit college in Toronto, Ontario, Canada. The college has students from over 60 countries making up approximately half of the students' population.

References

External links 
Stouffville College
Canadian Company Directories by Industrial Sector

Universities and colleges in Toronto
Colleges in Ontario
Private colleges in Ontario
Former for-profit universities and colleges in Canada